Glaci Teresinha Zancan (16 August 1935 —  29 June 2007) was a Brazilian biochemist, president of the Brazilian Society for the Progress of the Science (SBPC) from 1999 to 2003. She made her post doctorate at the University of Buenos Aires, when working with Luis Federico Leloir, Nobel prize of Medicine of 1970.

Life 
Born in São Borja, the scientist defended the increase of the female participation in research, with the universalization of research in the universities, and among others, participated in the preparation of the "National Plan of Postgrade Studies 2005-2010" coordinated by CAPES.

She established herself  in Curitiba, being professor of the Federal University of Paraná. She chaired the Brazilian Society of Biochemistry, vice-president of the SBPC from 1995- 1999 and later president  from 1999 to 2003 . In her last years of life, she was member of the CAPES higher board and of the  Education Council of the State of Paraná.

Honours 
 She received  in 2000 the Great Cross of the National Order of Scientific Merit.

Eponyms 
 In her honour  it was instituted  the "Trophy Women of Science Glaci Zancan"

References 

2007 deaths
1935 births
Recipients of the National Order of Scientific Merit (Brazil)
Brazilian chemists
Brazilian women scientists
Brazilian scientists
People from Rio Grande do Sul
Federal University of Paraná alumni
Academic staff of the Federal University of Paraná